Sequoyah is a census-designated place (CDP) in Rogers County, Oklahoma, United States. The population was 671 at the 2000 census.

Geography
Sequoyah is located at  (36.386400, -95.589467).

Demographics

As of the census of 2000, there were 671 people, 238 households, and 199 families residing in the CDP. The population density was 83.6 people per square mile (32.3/km2). There were 248 housing units at an average density of 30.9/sq mi (11.9/km2). The racial makeup of the CDP was 79.14% White, 0.15% African American, 12.67% Native American, 0.15% Pacific Islander, 0.15% from other races, and 7.75% from two or more races. Hispanic or Latino of any race were 1.79% of the population.

There were 238 households, out of which 36.6% had children under the age of 18 living with them, 77.7% were married couples living together, 3.4% had a female householder with no husband present, and 16.0% were non-families. 13.0% of all households were made up of individuals, and 6.7% had someone living alone who was 65 years of age or older. The average household size was 2.82 and the average family size was 3.07.

In the CDP, the population was spread out, with 27.7% under the age of 18, 4.3% from 18 to 24, 28.9% from 25 to 44, 27.6% from 45 to 64, and 11.5% who were 65 years of age or older. The median age was 39 years. For every 100 females, there were 100.3 males. For every 100 females age 18 and over, there were 100.4 males.

The median income for a household in the CDP was $43,542, and the median income for a family was $50,417. Males had a median income of $32,969 versus $31,250 for females. The per capita income for the CDP was $19,189. About 7.8% of families and 5.8% of the population were below the poverty line, including none of those under age 18 and 34.5% of those age 65 or over.

References

Census-designated places in Rogers County, Oklahoma
Census-designated places in Oklahoma
Cherokee towns in Oklahoma